Antoon Postma (Hanunó'o:  Buhid: ᝀᝈ᜔ᝆᝓᝈ᜔ ᝉᝓᝐ᜔ᝆ᜔ᝋ) (28 March 1929 – 22 October 2016) was a Dutch anthropologist who married into and lived among the Hanunuo, a Mangyan sub-tribe in southeastern Mindoro, Philippines.  He is best known for being the first to decipher the Laguna Copperplate Inscription, and for documenting the Hanunó'o script, paving the way for its preservation and understanding.

Sources

1929 births
2016 deaths
Dutch anthropologists
Dutch Protestant missionaries
Epigraphers
Protestant missionaries in the Philippines
Missionary linguists